The National Association of Mathematicians is a professional association for mathematicians in the US, especially African Americans and other minorities.  It was founded in 1969.

Lectures 
NAM hosts five lecture series that honor African American mathematicians. 

Two of these take place at the annual Joint Mathematics Meetings of the American Mathematical Society. The Cox-Talbot Lecture, named after Elbert Frank Cox and Walter Richard Talbot, is an hour-long lecture that takes place during the NAM Banquet. Invited speakers are mathematicians chosen for their achievement and service to the mathematical community. The Lecture was inaugurated in 1990, and past speakers include Nathan Alexander, Robert Q. Berry III, Talitha Washington, Roselyn E. Williams, Talithia Williams, Erica N. Walker, Garikai Campbell, and Tanya Moore (activist). 

The Claytor-Woodard Lecture at the JMM was inaugurated in 1980 and is named after Dudley Weldon Woodard and William Waldron Schieffelin Claytor. Each year a speaker is chosen on the basis of their work to improve opportunities in mathematical research for underrepresented American minorities. Past speakers include Ryan Hynd, Monica Jackson, Chelsea Walton, Suzanne Weekes, and Henok Mawi. 

The other three lecture series organised by NAM are:

 Albert Turner Bharucha-Reid Lecture at the Regional Faculty Conference on Research and Teaching Excellence
 MAA-NAM David Harold Blackwell Lecture at Mathematical Association of America (MAA) MathFest
 J. Ernest Wilkins Lecture at NAM's Undergraduate MATHFest.

History

At the 1969 Joint Mathematics Meetings in New Orleans, seventeen mathematicians met on Sunday January 26 to begin a new organization:

 James Ashley Donaldson, faculty at University Illinois at Chicago
 Samuel Horace Douglas, faculty at Grambling College
 Henry Madison Eldridge, faculty at Fayetteville State College
 Thyrsa Anne Frazier-Svager, faculty at Central State University
 Richard Griego, faculty at the University of New Mexico at Albuquerque
 Johnny Lee Houston, faculty Stillman College and graduate student at Purdue University
 Curtis Jefferson, faculty at Cuyahoga Community College
 Vivienne Malone-Mayes, faculty at Baylor University
 Theodore Portis, faculty at Alabama State University
 Charles R. Smith, faculty at Paine College
 Robert S. Smith, graduate student at Pennsylvania State University
 Beauregard Stubblefield, faculty at Texas Southern University
 Henry Thaggert, faculty at Jarvis Christian College
 Walter Richard Talbot, faculty at Morgan State College
 Argelia Valez-Rodriquez, faculty at Bishop College
 Harriet Rose Junior Walton, faculty at & Morehouse College
 Scott W. Williams , graduate student at Lehigh University

References

External links
 
 Board of Directors of the NAM

Mathematical societies
Organizations established in 1969